Torreón is a city and seat of Torreón Municipality in the Mexican state of Coahuila. As of 2021, the city's population was 735,340. The metropolitan population as of 2015 was 1,497,734, making it the ninth-biggest metropolitan area in the country and the largest metropolitan area in the state of Coahuila, as well as one of Mexico's most important economic and industrial centers. The cities of Torreón; Gómez Palacio, Durango; Lerdo, Durango; Matamoros; Francisco I. Madero; San Pedro; Bermejillo, Durango; and Tlahualilo, Durango form the area of La Laguna or the Comarca Lagunera, a basin within the Chihuahuan Desert.

The area was originally a center for ranching. With irrigation, the city became an important center for farming and the processing of cotton. In the middle of the 20th century, it became an industrial city. The cities (i.e. the metropolitan area) have industries in textiles, clothing and metals processing. Some important industries and companies have business here, like Peñoles, Motores John Deere, Grupo Lala, Yura Corporation, as well as stores like Soriana, Cimaco, and Extra. There are also several shopping malls in the city, including Galerias Laguna, Almanara, Plaza Cuatro Caminos, and InterMall.

Torreón is served by Francisco Sarabia International Airport, an airport with flights to several cities in Mexico and the United States.

History
According to archaeological findings, the area of Torreón was populated around the 10th millennium BC.

The first Spanish mission arrived in 1566, led by Fr. Pedro Espinareda. However, the city developed only in the independent Mexican era, around a Torreón ("Big Tower") built to monitor Río Nazas's floods, in conjunction with the creation of a railroad connecting to the US border city of El Paso, which gave an economic boom to the city and therefore a population boom as well. The population grew from 200 in 1892 to 34,000 in 1910. Torreón received city status in 1907.

During the Mexican Revolution (1910–1920), the city was taken more than once; the most prominent character ever to take the city was the revolutionary general Pancho Villa. It was also the location of the 1911 Torreón massacre, where 303 Chinese immigrants were killed by the revolutionaries over a ten-hour period. During the revolution, Torreón was also the site of an important convention that led to a deal between the rebellious armies.

After the Mexican Revolution, the city continued to develop economically; during the first years of the 20th century, the primary industry of the city was farming, although other industries later formed or were established in the area.

On September 15, 2007, Torreón celebrated its first 100 years as a chartered city. It held a series of cultural events from September 15, 2006, to September 15, 2007, culminating on the day that the city turned 100 years old.

Geography and climate 

Torreón is near the southwest border of the state of Coahuila, within the Laguna region of the state. The border is delineated by the Nazas River that separates it from Gómez Palacio, Durango.

The city features a desert climate (in the Köppen climate classification BWh). Rainfall is scarce but more prominent in the summer, whilst temperatures are very hot by day and cool at night, although the urban heat island effect causes temperatures on summer nights to be considerably warmer than nearby areas. Flora and fauna are those common to semidesert habitats.

Main sights 

Situated on the top of a hill, this image of Jesus with extended arms symbolises protection for the inhabitants of Torreon. The hilltop has a Catholic church and offers a view of the entire city.

There are also several shopping centers in the city, including Galerias Laguna, Plaza Cuatro Caminos, and Intermall.

The "Canal de la Perla" (the Pearl Watercourse), an underground watercourse built in the 19th century to drive the Nazas' river water to the fields near the city, was re-discovered in 2003 and re-opened in 2014. It now passes under the oldest part of the city and it can be visited and walked through. It is also used for cultural and artistic exhibitions.

In 2006, the "Museo Arocena" (Arocena Museum) that holds art collections from the pre-Hispanic times to the present, was opened; it also has a section dedicated to Mexico's and Torreón's history. There are also temporal expositions, conferences, book fairs, movies, and activities for children.

Economy
The area was originally a center for ranching. With irrigation the city became an important center for support for farming and processing of cotton. In the middle of the 20th century, it became an industrial city. The city has industries in textiles, clothing and metals processing. Some important industries and companies that have business here, like Peñoles, an important Mexican mining group, and Motores John Deere, Lala, an important dairy products company, Yura Corporation, stores like Soriana, Cimaco, Extra, among others.

Education

Universities 
Torreón and the surrounding comarca are served by several public and private universities. Some of the most recognized institutions in the area are:

 Universidad Autónoma Agraria Antonio Narro (Unidad Laguna (UAAAN))
 Autonomous University of Coahuila (Universidad Autónoma de Coahuila (UAdeC))
 Universidad Autónoma de la Laguna
 Autonomous University of the Northeast (Universidad Autónoma del Noreste (UANE))
 Iberoamerican University Torreón (Universidad Iberoamericana Torreón (Ibero))

 Valley of Mexico University (Universidad del Valle de México (UVM))
 Monterrey Institute of Technology and Higher Education (Instituto Tecnológico y de Estudios Superiores de Monterrey (ITESM))
 La Laguna Institute of Technology (Instituto Tecnológico de la Laguna)
 TecMilenio University (Universidad TecMilenio)
 Torreon Institute of Technology (Instituto Tecnológico de Torreón)
 Torreon Technological University (Universidad Tecnológica de Torreón)

Sports 

Torreón has a football team in the Liga MX named Santos Laguna. The team won championships in 1996, 2001, 2008, 2012, 2015, and 2018. It used to play in Estadio Corona, until 2009 when it moved to the Territorio Santos Modelo to meet the growing demands of its fan base.

The city is also home to a baseball team called "Vaqueros Laguna" (Laguna Cowboys) of the Mexican League. They play at Estadio Revolución.

Torreón's professional basketball team, Jefes de Fuerza Lagunera, play in the Municipal Auditorium, which seats approximately 3,000 people. They are members of the LNBP (Liga Nacional de Baloncesto Profesional) which is considered to be the top basketball league in Mexico.

Former NFL placekicker and Super Bowl XXI champion, Raul Allegre, is a Torreón native.

Events

Cotton and Grape Fair 
The main annual festival in Torreón is the Cotton and Grape Fair (Feria del Algodón y La Uva) which takes place in September. It contains cultural events, music, food and amusement rides.

Independence Day
It takes place on September 15 and 16. There are celebrations all around the city, but the most important is the one celebrated in the Plaza Mayor. People wear traditional Mexican clothes, eat traditional dishes and "Antojitos". At night the city mayor makes the traditional celebration of "El Grito". The next day (September 16) there is a parade on the Morelos Avenue.

Twin towns – sister cities
 Reynosa, Mexico
 Culiacan, Mexico
 Hermosillo, Mexico
 Chihuahua, Mexico
 Laredo, United States
 El Paso, United States

Notable people
Carlos Acevedo, footballer
Raul Allegre, former NFL Placekicker
William Andrew Archer, American botanist
Bandido, professional wrestler
Mariana Bayón, winner of the first cycle of Mexico's Next Top Model
Demián Bichir, actor
Odiseo Bichir, actor
Black Warrior, wrestler
Ronaldo Cisneros, footballer
Dr. Wagner Jr., wrestler
Carlos Ferro, actor
Raúl Méndez, actor
Ricardo Montalbán, actor
Pablo Montero, singer
Oribe Peralta, footballer
Carmen Salinas, actress
Jorge Sánchez (footballer, born 1997)), footballer
Alberto Vázquez, singer
Sergio Villarreal Barragán, Mexican drug lord and former leader of Beltrán-Leyva Cartel
Humberto Zurita, actor

References

External links 

 Ayuntamiento de Torreón official website
 Economic Development Laguna de Coahuila official website
 Google maps satellite photo of the city
 Link to tables of population data from Census of 2005 INEGI: Instituto Nacional de Estadística, Geografía e Informática
 Coahuila Enciclopedia de los Municipios de México
 

 
Populated places in Coahuila
Populated places established in 1893
1893 establishments in Mexico